Legislative elections were held in the Russian Soviet Federative Socialist Republic on 26 June 1938, the first after the establishment of the Soviet Union.

Background
The constitution of the USSR was adopted on 5 December 1936, in accordance with which elections were held for new bodies at all levels from local councils and ending with the Supreme Council of the Soviet Union.

Results

References

Russia
Legislative elections in Russia
Russian Soviet Federative Socialist Republic
One-party elections
Russia
Supreme Soviet of Russia